The 1884 Melbourne Cup was a two-mile handicap horse race which took place on Tuesday, 4 November 1884.

This year was the twenty-fourth running of the Melbourne Cup.

This is the list of placegetters for the 1884 Melbourne Cup.

See also

 Melbourne Cup
 List of Melbourne Cup winners
 Victoria Racing Club

References

External links
1884 Melbourne Cup footyjumpers.com

1884
Melbourne Cup
Melbourne Cup
19th century in Melbourne
1880s in Melbourne